Schwender is a German surname. Notable people with the surname include:

Herbert Schwender (1912–1944), German military officer
John D. Schwender, American college football coach

See also
Schwende (disambiguation)

German-language surnames